Mitch Jacobson (born 13 January 1996) is a New Zealand rugby union footballer who currently plays as a loose forward for  in the ITM Cup.

Jacobson was a New Zealand Schools representative in 2014 and a year later he was a member of the New Zealand side which won the 2015 IRB Junior World Championship in Italy.

Super Rugby Career
In 2019 Jacobson was selected as an injury replacement for the Chiefs and played 2 games. He was not retained for the following season however was picked for the Sunwolves in 2020 for their last year in Super Rugby.

References

1996 births
Living people
New Zealand rugby union players
Rugby union flankers
Rugby union number eights
Waikato rugby union players
People from Te Awamutu
People educated at Cambridge High School, New Zealand
Sunwolves players
Chiefs (rugby union) players
Rugby union players from Waikato
New England Free Jacks players